Christian Lundberg (born 24 August 1970) is a retired Danish football striker. He became top goalscorer of the 1999–2000 Danish 1st Division.

References

1970 births
Living people
Danish men's footballers
Vejle Boldklub players
Esbjerg fB players
Skive IK players
Ikast FS players
FC Midtjylland players
Akademisk Boldklub players
Ethnikos Asteras F.C. players
Aarhus Fremad players
AaB Fodbold players
Randers FC players
KÍ Klaksvík players
GÍ Gøta players
Danish Superliga players
Danish 1st Division players
Super League Greece players
Association football forwards
Danish expatriate men's footballers
Expatriate footballers in Greece
Danish expatriate sportspeople in Greece
Expatriate footballers in the Faroe Islands
People from Skive Municipality
Sportspeople from the Central Denmark Region